The Apache of Marseilles is a 1919 German silent thriller film directed by Ewald André Dupont and starring Max Landa, Hanni Weisse, and Reinhold Schünzel.

Cast

References

Bibliography

External links

1919 films
Films of the Weimar Republic
Films directed by E. A. Dupont
German silent feature films
German black-and-white films
German thriller films
1920s thriller films
Silent thriller films
1910s German films
1920s German films